Microgoes is a monotypic beetle genus in the family Cerambycidae described by Casey in 1913. Its single species, Microgoes oculatus, was described by John Lawrence LeConte in 1862.

References

Lamiini
Beetles described in 1862
Monotypic beetle genera